Pirwani (Aymara pirwa, piwra granary, -ni a suffix to indicate ownership, "the one with a granary", Hispanicized spelling Pirhuani) is a mountain in the Andes of Bolivia, about  high. It is situated in the Potosí Department, Antonio Quijarro Province, in the east of the Uyuni Municipality. Janq'u Qullu lies south-west of the mountains Warachi Qullu and Janq'u Qullu. It is situated east of the Chillawa River (Chillahua) which flows to the south.

References 

Mountains of Potosí Department